Oreopanax raimondii is a species of plant in the family Araliaceae. It is endemic to Peru.

References

Flora of Peru
raimondii
Vulnerable plants
Taxonomy articles created by Polbot